The 1981 Embassy World Darts Championship was the fourth year that the British Darts Organisation had staged a world championship. The field was expanded from 24 to 32 players, the format which would remain for many years. For the third successive year the tournament was staged at Jollees Cabaret Club in Stoke-on-Trent.

Eric Bristow was back to defend his title and would face John Lowe the champion of two years previously in the final. The final was the best of nine sets, but there was a break scheduled after three sets where the third-fourth place play-off match would be held.

Lowe ran away with the first two sets without dropping a leg and took the first leg in the third set before Bristow finally got onto the scoreboard. The "Crafty Cockney" held on to take that third set to go into the break just one set behind. As in the previous year's final, Bristow edged ahead to lead 4–3 in sets and Lowe (as Bobby George did in 1980) had darts to take the match into a final set. However Lowe missed three attempts at double ten and Bristow took out double four to win the title for the second year running.

Seeds

Prize money
The prize fund was £22,800.

Champion: £5,500
Runner-Up: £2,500
3rd Place: £600
Semi-Finalists (2): £1,200
Quarter-Finalists (4): £750
Last 16 (8): £500
Last 32 (16): £300

There was also a 9-Dart Checkout prize of £52,000, along with a High Checkout prize of £500.

Results

Preliminary round
A best of three sets preliminary round match took place between Steve Brennan and Wayne Lock, as they were tied on the rankings.

Last 32

Third place match (best of 3 sets)
 Cliff Lazarenko (5) 75.06 2– 1 Tony Brown (2) 75.42

References

BDO World Darts Championships
BDO World Darts 1981
Bdo World Darts Championship, 1981
Bdo World Darts Championship